Plebidonax is a genus of bivalves belonging to the family Psammobiidae.

The species of this genus are found in Australia and Malesia.

Species:
Plebidonax deltoides 
Plebidonax kenyoniana

References

Bivalves
Bivalve genera